is a Japanese voice actress signed to Style Cube and a member of the musical unit StylipS. Her major voice roles include Sapphire Kawashima in Sound! Euphonium, Kanon Matsubara in BanG Dream!, Vivi Lin in idol Memories, Fumi Kujo in Jinsei, and Fuyumi Fukagawa in Pan de Peace!.

Filmography

AnimeNakaimo – My Sister Is Among Them! (2012) – studentSo, I Can't Play H! (2012) – GirlBeyond the Boundary (2013) – Sakura InamiChronicles of the Going Home Club (2013) – RefereePolar Bear Cafe (2013)Jinsei (2014) – Fumi KujōLove, Tenchi Muyo! (2014) – student Recently, My Sister Is Unusual (2014) – Mei-chan, tennis staff BSaki – The Nationals (2014) – Kurumi KakuraSound! Euphonium (2015) – Sapphire KawashimaPan de Peace! (2016) – Fuyumi FukagawaIdol Memories (2016)  – Vivi LinSound! Euphonium 2 (2016) – Sapphire KawashimaAction Heroine Cheer Fruits (2017) – Hatsuri MomoiBanG Dream! (2018–present) – Kanon MatsubaraBanG Dream! Girls Band Party! Pico (2018)BanG Dream! 2nd Season (2019)BanG Dream! Film Live (2019)BanG Dream! 3rd Season (2020)BanG Dream! Girls Band Party! Pico: Ohmori (2020)BanG Dream! Film Live 2nd Stage (2021)BanG Dream! Girls Band Party! Pico Fever! (2021)Hulaing Babies (2019) – MoeNobunaga Teacher's Young Bride (2019) – Anna AtsutaHulaing Babies☆Petit (2020) – MoeKing's Raid: Successors of the Will (2020) – JaneTeppen!!!!!!!!!!!!!!! Laughing 'til You Cry (2022) – Misao UshikuBoruto: Naruto Next Generations (2022) – HibikiSound! Euphonium 3 (2024) – Sapphire KawashimaSeiyū Radio no Ura Omote (TBA) – Yūhi Yūgure/Chika Watanabe

FilmsSound! Euphonium: The Movie - Welcome to the Kitauji High School Concert Band (2016) – Sapphire KawashimaSound! Euphonium: Todoketai Melody (2017) – Sapphire KawashimaLiz and the Blue Bird (2018) – Sapphire KawashimaSound! Euphonium The Movie - Our Promise: A Brand New Day (2019) – Sapphire KawashimaIdol Bu Show (2022) – Koharu Hoshizuki

OVAKissxsis (2013) – Discipline committee memberRecently, My Sister Is Unusual (2014) – Mei-chanSound! Euphonium; theatrical OVA (TBA) (2023) – Sapphire Kawashima

Video gamesThousand Memories (2013)Fairy Fencer F (2013) – KhalaraOmega Quintet (2014) – KanadekoGirl Friend Beta (2014) – Yuka KoizumiHeroes Placement (2014) - Fenrir White
Groove Coaster 3: Link Fever (2016) – Linka
BanG Dream! Girls Band Party! – Kanon Matsubara
Shadowverse – Leaf Man
King's Raid (2018) – Jane, May
Last Period (2020) - Huskeal

Blue Archive (2021) - Hanako Urawa

References

External links
  
 Moe Toyota at Oricon 
 

1995 births
Living people
Voice actresses from Ibaraki Prefecture
Japanese voice actresses
Japanese video game actresses
21st-century Japanese singers
21st-century Japanese women singers
StylipS members